Bon Secours - Southside Medical Center is a 300-bed  hospital near the Petersburg, VA tri-cities, VA area. The hospital was originally started in 1948 by the city of Petersburg, but was sold to Community Health Systems (a conglomerate based in Tennessee) in 2003  and relocated. The hospital is designated as a Level III Trauma Center by the Virginia Department of Health.

Hospital rating data
The LeapFrog
group recently rated the hospital with a B rating overall.

School of Nursing
SRMC has offered nurse training since 1895. Since January 2005, the hospital has also offered online nursing training including bachelor's degrees  that is used by other Community Health Systems hospitals, including Chestnut Hill Hospital in Philadelphia, Pottstown Memorial Medical Center in Montgomery County, and Jennersville Regional Hospital and Phoenixville Hospital, both in Chester County.

References

Hospital buildings completed in 1948
1948 establishments in Virginia
Hospitals in Virginia
Community Health Systems